The Edward B. and Nettie E. Evans House is a historic building located in Des Moines, Iowa, United States.  It is significant as the best Free Classic Queen Anne style dwelling in the city. It is a transitional architectural style.  The 2½-story structure shows elements of both the Queen Anne and the Neoclassical styles. The Queen Anne is found in the asymmetrical plan, the complex roof treatment, the full width and recessed porches, and contrasting shingle patterns.  The Neoclassical is found in the window and door trim, the grouped classical porch columns, and the Palladian window in the attic level.

Edward Evans was a lawyer who was the first secretary of the Drake College of Law, now the Drake University Law School, and the school's second Dean.  He was also a law professor, and he authored a textbook.  Edward and his wife Nettie lived here from 1899, when the house was built, until 1910.  The house was listed on the National Register of Historic Places in 2002.

References 

Houses completed in 1899
Queen Anne architecture in Iowa
Houses in Des Moines, Iowa
National Register of Historic Places in Des Moines, Iowa
Houses on the National Register of Historic Places in Iowa